The FIS Alpine World Ski Championships 1962 were held in France from 10 to 18 February at Chamonix in Haute-Savoie.

Chamonix previously hosted the alpine world championships in 1937, and also the first Winter Olympics in 1924, but without alpine skiing, which debuted in 1936.

Men's competitions

Downhill

Date: February 18

Giant Slalom

Date: February 15

Slalom

Date: February 12

Combined

Women's competitions

Downhill

Date: February 18

Giant Slalom

Date: February 11

Slalom

Date: February 14

Combined

Medals table

References

External links
FIS-ski.com - results - 1962 World Championships - Chamonix, France
FIS-ski.com - official results for the FIS Alpine World Ski Championships

1962 in alpine skiing
1962 in French sport
1962
A
Alpine skiing competitions in France
February 1962 sports events in Europe